"3-Tage-Bart" ("designer stubble";  "3-days-beard") is a punk song by German band Die Ärzte. It is the fourth track on and the first single from their 1996 album Le Frisur. The song is about a man who has everything he may want and need, but he is missing one thing—the stubble.

Track listing 
 "3-Tage-Bart" - 3:02
 "Chanson d'Albert" - 3:11
 "Haar (Vader Abraham Respect-Mix)" - 3:43
 "In den See! Mit einem Gewicht an den Füßen!" - 4:15
 "Opfer (live von Chris Heckmann)" - 1:48

Music video
In the video, Die Ärzte are running and jumping on a beach, obviously happy and on the other hand performing some kind of dance, singing the song in another location. The video very often jumps between those two locations. The video was filmed in Spain, during a tour break, and was released on the Killer DVD/VHS. "The Making of" was released on the Gefangen im Schattenreich von Die Ärzte DVD/VHS.

B-sides 
 "Chanson d'Albert" (Albert's song in French) is the English language version of "Schunder-Song" which appeared on their album, Planet Punk. It is about a violent girl and is dedicated to Albert Slendebroek, the head of Metronome.
 The original version of "Haar" (hair) is from Le Frisur. It is a song  from the musical Hair. The remix is not on the vinyl version of the single.
 "In den See! Mit einem Gewicht an den Füßen!" (Into the lake! With a weight attached to the legs!) was the intro for the "Voodoo Lounge" tour.
 "Opfer" (victim) is originally from the album Planet Punk.

Personnel
Farin Urlaub – lead vocals, guitar
Bela B. – vocals (bridge), drums
Rodrigo González – bass

Charts

1996 singles
Die Ärzte songs
Songs written by Farin Urlaub
Songs written by Bela B.
1996 songs